Kvalheim is a coastal village with large agricultural areas in Kinn Municipality in Vestland county, Norway. The neighboring villages of Refvika and Vedvika are located across the mountain to the northeast. The nearest town is the municipal center of Måløy which is about a 15-minute drive to the southeast.

Kvalheim has a population (2001) of 163. The village of Kvalheim is mentioned in sources reaching back to the 14th century. Some immigrants from Norway took this name as their surname when they traveled to the United States.

References

Villages in Vestland
Kinn